The late medieval cookbook  Du fait de cuisine ("On cookery")  was written in 1420 in part to compete with the court of Burgundy by Maistre Chiquart, master chef of Amadeus VIII, Duke of Savoy.

Notes

Medieval cookbooks
French cookbooks
1420 books